Ramin Mehmanparast is an Iranian diplomat, the former spokesman of the Iranian foreign ministry and the former ambassador to Poland and Lithuania. He was the deputy Minister of Foreign Affairs, the head of the "Center for Public Diplomacy & Media" and the spokesperson of the Ministry of Foreign Affairs from 31 October 2009 until his resignation on 11 May 2013. He was also the ambassador of Iran to Thailand from 1996 to 2000 and Kazakhstan from 2004 to 2009.

After the December 2012 Sandy Hook shooting in the United States, Mehmanparast expressed his condolences to the American people and the victims' families.

Mehmanparast was nominated for 2013 presidential election on 11 May 2013 and left his position as the spokesman of the Iranian Foreign Ministry on the same day. He withdrew from his nomination on 19 May 2013.

Marriage 
He married Iranian actress Maryam Kavyani in October 2018.

References

External links

 رامین مهمانپرست سخنگوی وزارت امور خارجه شد Mardomsalari Newspaper

Living people
Iranian diplomats
Spokespersons for the Ministry of Foreign Affairs of Iran
1960 births